Baron Cozens-Hardy, of Letheringsett in the County of Norfolk, was a title in the Peerage of the United Kingdom. It was created on 1 July 1914 for Sir Herbert Cozens-Hardy, Master of the Rolls from 1907 to 1918. He was succeeded by his eldest son, the second Baron. He represented Norfolk South in Parliament as a Liberal. He was succeeded by his younger brother, the third Baron. The title became extinct on the death of the fourth Baron on 11 September 1975.

Barons Cozens-Hardy (1914)
Herbert Hardy Cozens-Hardy, 1st Baron Cozens-Hardy (1838–1920)
William Hepburn Cozens-Hardy, 2nd Baron Cozens-Hardy (1868–1924)
Edward Herbert Cozens-Hardy, 3rd Baron Cozens-Hardy (1873–1956)
Herbert Arthur Cozens-Hardy, 4th Baron Cozens-Hardy (1907–1975)

References
*

Extinct baronies in the Peerage of the United Kingdom
Noble titles created in 1914
Noble titles created for UK MPs
History of Norfolk